The Transylvanian Saxons (Transylvanian Saxon: Siweberjer Såksen or simply Soxen, singularly Sox or Soax; Transylvanian Landler: Soxn or Soxisch;) are a people of mainly German ethnicity (and overall Germanic origin; mostly Luxembourgish initially during the medieval Ostsiedlung settlement, then also from other parts of present-day Germany) who settled in Transylvania (Medieval Latin: Trānsylvānia) in various waves, starting from the mid and mid-late 12th century until the mid 19th century. 

Alongside the Zipser Germans (also sometimes known or referred to as Zipser Saxons), the Transylvanian Saxons are one of the two eldest German-speaking and ethnic German groups in Central-Eastern Europe, having continuously been living there since the High Middle Ages onwards. The Transylvanian Saxons are part of the Romanian Germans as well, being one of the most important constituent groups of this community.

Their native dialect, Transylvanian Saxon (endonym: Siweberjesch-Såksesch) is close to Luxembourgish. Nowadays, organisations representing the Transylvanian Saxons exist in Romania, Germany, Austria, Canada, and the United States (in the latter case most notably 'Alliance of Transylvanian Saxons'). Other smaller communities of Transylvanian Saxons can be found in South Africa and Australia as well as South America (for example in Argentina).

Background 

The legal foundation of their settlement in southern, southeastern, and northeastern Transylvania was officially stipulated within the Diploma Andreanum issued by King Andrew II of Hungary which allocated them the royal land under local autonomy known as Königsboden or Fundus Regius in Latin.

The ancestors of the modern Transylvanian Saxons originally came from the contemporary Low Countries (more specifically the regions of Flanders, Hainaut, Brabant, Liège, or Zeeland) as well as the Moselle and Lorraine river valleys, and, very importantly, Luxembourg as well, then situated in the north-western territories of the Holy Roman Empire around the 1140s. 

Further or subsequent waves of German colonists in Transylvania also stemmed from more southern regions of present-day Germany such as Thuringia or even Bavaria (the latter particularly valid for the Saxons in northeastern Transylvania). The initial waves of Transylvanian Saxons were referred to as hospites flandrenses et teutonici or primi hospites regni in Latin, literally "the Flemish and Teutonic guests" or "the first guests of the kingdom" (i.e. of the former Kingdom of Hungary).

For centuries, the main tasks of the Transylvanian Saxons during the High Middle Ages were to protect the easternmost frontiers of the former Kingdom of Hungary against certain invading migratory Asiatic peoples, to bring more agriculture to the region, to instil Central European culture, enhance trade, and boost urbanisation and overall economic development. In the process of fortifying the borders of the Kingdom of Hungary to the east, they were early on helped by the Teutonic Knights. Later on, they had to further strengthen their hometowns and rural settlements against the expanding Ottoman Empire which posed a major threat from the south. The rural settlements were more protected with a series of fortified churches known as 'kirchenburgen' in standard German. An alternative term for them in standard German is also 'wehrkirchen' (i.e. fortified churches).

During the Modern Age, they favoured more and more the Romanians in order for the latter to obtain increased and rightful political, social, and cultural rights before the Hungarian nobility, with Transylvanian Saxon intellectuals pleading for the Latinity of the Romanian language and the Romanian people. They were subsequently allied with the Transylvanian Romanians and thus sided with the Austrian Empire in the context of the Hungarian Revolution of 1848.

After 1918 and the dissolution of Austria-Hungary, in the wake of the Treaty of Trianon (signed in 1920), Transylvania united with the Kingdom of Romania, after the Transylvanian Saxons also voted for the union with the Romanian kingdom in February 1919. Consequently, the Transylvanian Saxons, together with other ethnic German sub-groups in then newly enlarged Kingdom of Romania (namely the Banat Swabians, Sathmar Swabians, Bessarabia Germans, Bukovina Germans, and Zipser Germans), became part of that country's broader German minority. Today, relatively few still live in Romania, where the second last official census (carried out in 2011) indicated 36,042 Germans, out of which only 11,400 were of Transylvanian Saxon descent. As per the latest Romanian census conducted in 2022, their numbers are even fewer, as those of the entire German community in Romania as well.

Historical overview 

The colonization of Transylvania by ethnic Germans later collectively known as Transylvanian Saxons began under the reign of King Géza II of Hungary (1141–1162). For several consecutive centuries, the main task of these medieval German-speaking settlers (as that of the Szeklers for example in the east of Transylvania) was to defend the southern, southeastern, and northeastern borders of the then Kingdom of Hungary against foreign invaders stemming most notably from Central Asia and even far East Asia (e.g. Cumans, Pechenegs, Mongols, and Tatars). At the same time, the Saxons were also charged with developing agriculture and introducing Central European culture. Later on, the Saxons needed to further fortify both their rural and urban settlements against invading Ottomans (or against the invading and expanding Ottoman Empire). The Saxons in northeastern Transylvania were also in charge of mining. They can be perceived as being quite related to the Zipser Saxons from present-day Slovakia (as well as other historical regions of contemporary Romania, namely Maramureș and Bukovina) given the fact they are two of the oldest ethnic German groups in non-native German-speaking Central and Eastern Europe.

The first wave of settlement continued well until the end of the 13th century. Although the colonists came mostly from the western Holy Roman Empire and generally spoke Franconian dialectal varieties, they came to be collectively referred to as 'Saxons' because of Germans working for the royal Hungarian chancellery. 

Gradually, the type of medieval German once spoken by these settlers, craftsmen, guardsmen, miners, and various other workers became locally known as Såksesch (i.e. Transylvanian Saxon; in its longest form Siweberjesch-Såksesch) and remains, still to this day, very closely related to Luxembourgish with which it shares many lexical similarities.

The Transylvanian Saxon population has been steadily decreasing since World War II as they started leaving the territory of present-day Romania en masse during and after World War II, relocating initially to Austria, then predominantly to southern Germany (especially in Bavaria).

The process of emigration continued during communist rule in Romania. After the collapse of the Ceaușescu regime in 1989 and the fall of the East German communist government, many of them continued to emigrate to unified Germany. As a result, today only approximately 12,000 Saxons remain in Romania.

Nowadays, the vast majority of Transylvanian Saxons live in either Germany or Austria. Nonetheless, a sizable Transylvanian Saxon population also resides today in North America, most notably in the United States (specifically in Idaho, Ohio, and Colorado as well as in Canada, southern Ontario more precisely).

On the history of the Transylvanian Saxons, it is very important to note what former federal German president and professor doctor Theodor Heuss (FDP) stated, namely: "...their history is a piece of German history as a whole...".

Origins and medieval settlements 

Additionally, the surrounding areas of the present-day town of Sibiu/Hermannstadt (former European Capital of Culture in 2007 alongside Luxembourg City) were formed of marshlands in the High Middle Ages. This is further hinted but also highlighted in the coat of arms of the town of Sibiu/Hermannstadt by the water lily included therein.

These German settlers were invited by Géza II. Although the primary reason for Géza II's invitation was border defence, similar to employing the Szeklers against foreign invaders in the east of Transylvania, Germans were also sought for their mining expertise as well as the ability to develop the region's economy. Most colonists to this area came from Luxembourg (Luxembourgish: Lëtzebuerg) and the Moselle River region (see for instance Medardus de Nympz, former knight and founder of the fortified village of Niemesch/Nemșa in Moșna).

A second phase of German settlement during the early 13th century consisted of settlers primarily stemming from the Rhineland region, the southern Low Countries, and the Moselle region, with others from Thuringia, Bavaria, and even from France. That area was important for mining in the Middle Ages.

Continued immigration from the Empire expanded the area of the Saxons further to the east. Settlers from the Hermannstadt region spread into the Hârtibaciu River valley and to the foot of the Cibin and Sebeș mountains.

Allegedly, the term Saxon was applied to all Germans of these historical regions because the first German settlers who came to the Kingdom of Hungary were either poor miners or groups of convicts from Saxony.

The Kingdom of Hungary's medieval eastern borders were therefore defended in the northeast by the  Saxons, in the east by the Hungarian border guard tribe of the Székelys, in the southeast by the castles built by the Teutonic Knights and  Saxons and in the south by the Altland Saxons.

A common interpretation of the tale of the Pied Piper of Hamelin, dated to 26 June 1284 and recorded in Hamelin records that (the earliest of such records dating from 1384: "It is 100 years since our children left") when a group of 130 children from the town of Hamelin, in present-day Lower Saxony, were led away from their hometown by a piper (who may be a folk memory of a lokator) is that this related to an emigration event as part of the Ostsiedlung (i.e. Eastern settlement). The destination is usually supposed to have been Prignitz, Uckermark, and Pomerania, but a minor alternative theory suggests settlement in Transylvania.

The proper usage of the term Saxon in the context of medieval Transylvania 

In the context of medieval Transylvania, the term Saxon was used to denote a nobleman's title and not necessarily someone who was German-speaking. In these regards, the Saxon title could have been awarded to someone who was a non-native German speaker as well. It is, therefore, very important to highlight the fact that not all Transylvanian Saxon settlers were German-speaking given the fact that they also stemmed from the contemporary Low Countries (i.e. aside from Luxembourg, also contemporary Netherlands and Belgium) and from modern day France as well. Additionally, it is equally important to mention the fact that the family name 'Sas' or 'Sasu' in Romanian and 'Szász' respectively in Hungarian could denote both an ethnic lineage as well as a social liaison to the Saxon title awarded in Transylvania during the High Middle Ages.

Transylvanian Saxon ethnic consciousness 

Hence, taking in consideration the aforementioned regarding the Saxon title in high medieval Transylvania, the Transylvanian Saxons' ethnic consciousness subsequently solidified after the first waves of settlers from Western Europe arrived in Transylvania and was further reinforced or revitalised with new settlers from central and southern present-day Germany during the Modern Age, more specifically during the 19th century. Transylvanian Saxon intellectual Stephan Ludwig Roth also pleaded for a strengthening of the German element in Transylvania during the 19th century by means of more waves of settlers stemming from contemporary Germany while at the same time firstly supporting the rights of the ethnic Romanians.

Medieval organization

Legal organization 

Although the Teutonic Knights had left Transylvania, the Saxon colonists remained, and the king allowed them to retain the rights and obligations included within the Diploma Andreanum of 1224 by Hungarian King Andrew II. This document conferred upon the German population of the territory between Drăușeni and Orăștie both administrative and religious autonomy and defined their obligations towards the Hungarian monarchs. Consequently, they had to pay yearly tax to the king and provide military contributions to the royal army in case of danger of attack from abroad.

Otherwise, they enjoyed suzerainty; even Hungarians could not settle down in the Saxon territories. The territory colonized by Germans covered an area of about 30,000 km2 (10,000 sq. mi.). The region was called Royal Lands or Saxon Lands. During the reign of Hungarian King Charles I (probably 1325–1329; also referred to as Charles Robert d'Anjou), the Saxons were organized in the Saxon Chairs (or seats) as follows:

The territorial extent of the aforementioned Saxon seats can be clearly seen in depth in the maps from the gallery below:

Aside from the Saxon seats, there had also been two districts, namely Bistritz/Bistrița and Kronstadt/Brașov, which had the following territorial extent, as depicted in the maps below:

Religious organizations 

Along with the Teutonic Order, other religious organizations important to the development of German communities were the Cistercian abbeys of Igrisch (Igriș) in the Banat region respectively Kerz (Cârța) in Fogaraschland (Țara Făgărașului). The earliest religious organization of the Saxons was the Provostship of Hermannstadt (now Sibiu), founded 20 December 1191. In its early years, it included the territories of Hermannstadt, Leschkirch (Nocrich), and Groß-Schenk (Cincu), the areas that were colonized the earliest by ethnic Germans in the region.

Under the influence of Johannes Honterus, the great majority of the Transylvanian Saxons embraced the new creed of Martin Luther during the Protestant Reformation. The first superintendent of the Saxons Evangelical Church, Paul Wiener, was elected by Saxon pastors at a synod on 6 February 1553.

Almost all became Lutheran Protestants, with very few Calvinists, while other minor segments of the Transylvanian Saxon society remained staunchly Catholic (of Latin Rite, more specifically) or were converted to Catholicism later on. Nonetheless, one of the consequences of the Reformation was the emergence of an almost perfect equivalence, in the Transylvanian context, of the terms Lutheran and Saxon, with the Lutheran Church in Transylvania being de facto a "Volkskirche", i.e. the "national church" of the Transylvanian Saxons (or the people's church of the Saxons).

Fortification of the towns 

The Mongol invasion of 1241–42 devastated much of the Kingdom of Hungary. Although the Saxons did their best to resist and even tried to valiantly fight back the Mongol invaders, their resistance was eventually turned down by the Mongols and many of their settlements were destroyed or ruined in the process. After the Mongols retreated from Transylvania, in the event of another invasion, many Transylvanian towns were fortified with stone castles and an emphasis was put on developing towns economically. In the Middle Ages, approximately 300 villages were defended by the Kirchenburgen, or fortified churches with massive walls and watch towers.

Although many of these fortified churches have fallen into either decay or ruin, nowadays the south-eastern region of Transylvania still has one of the highest density of existing fortified churches from the 13th to 16th centuries as more than 150 villages in the area count various types of fortified churches in good shape, seven of them being included in the UNESCO World Heritage under the name of Villages with fortified churches in Transylvania. The rapid expansion of cities populated by the Saxons led to Transylvania being known in German as Siebenbürgen and Septem Castra or Septem Castrensis in Latin, referring to seven of the fortified towns (see Historical names of Transylvania), most likely:

 Nösen/Bistritz (Transylvanian Saxon: Bästerts)
 Hermannstadt (Transylvanian Saxon: Härmeschtat/Hermestatt)
 Klausenburg
 Kronstadt (Transylvanian Saxon: Kruhnen)
 Mediasch (Transylvanian Saxon: Medwesch/Medwisch)
 Mühlbach (Transylvanian Saxon: Melnbach/Mühllenbach)
 Schässburg/Schäßburg (Transylvanian Saxon: Schäsbrich)

Other potential candidates for this list include:

 Broos (Transylvanian Saxon: Brooss)
 Sächsisch-Regen (Transylvanian Saxon: Reen)

Other notable urban Saxon settlements include:
 Heltau (Transylvanian Saxon: Hielt)
 Rosenau ( Transylvanian Saxon: Ruusenåå)
 Reps (Transylvanian Saxon: Räppes)

Fortification of the villages 

In addition to fortifying their towns over the passing of time, the Transylvanian Saxons also had to fortify their villages by building their fortified churches (the Transylvanian Saxons were initially strongly Roman Catholic then Evangelical Lutheran after the Reformation). 

These fortified churches, or kirchenburgen as they are known in standard German, had defensive capacities in the event of a foreign attack on a rural Transylvanian Saxon community (e.g. extensive inner and outer walls and a fortified watch tower). Such an attack would often stem from the Cumans, for example, or from the Pechenegs. It was estimated that there are approximately 300 such villages with fortified churches built by the Saxons in Transylvania during the Middle Ages. 

The majority of them are still in very good to relatively good shape to this day, after further consolidation and renovation based on European funds or Norwegian grants (for example in Alma Vii or Laslea), but also based on foreign donations. Nevertheless, there also some still left in ruin or decay, since the vast majority of the Saxons in their respective villages left them deserted during either before 1989 and after 1989 while emigrating for Western Europe or North America.

Medieval colonies outside the Carpathian arch 

The Transylvanian Saxons also colonized areas outside the Carpathian arch, and, implicitly, outside their newly native lands across Transylvania starting from the mid and mid-late 12th century. Those areas pertained to the neighbouring and emerging Romanian medieval principalities of Moldavia (to the east) and Wallachia (to the south).

In this particular process, they founded or co-founded major historical settlements in both principalities such as Târgu Neamț, Baia, Târgoviște, or Câmpulung. In the case of the first settlement (i.e. Târgu Neamț), they could have been equally helped in establishing it by the Teutonic Knights. Saxons in Wallachia also settled in Râmnic (i.e. present-day Râmnicu Vâlcea) and Pitești.

Saxon colonization in Moldavia had likely occurred through a crossing from the Bistrița area eastward and northward whereas Saxon colonization in Wallachia had likely occurred from the Sibiu/Hermannstadt area. Moreover, under the title of Schultheiß, ethnic Germans were even briefly in charge of some of these settlements during the High Middle Ages. Additionally, German potters and merchants were also present in the former Moldavian capital of Suceava at the end of the 14th century. Historically, the town of Suceava has also been known in Old High German as Sedschopff.

The newly arrived Saxons outside in the Carpathian arch in the emerging medieval Romanian principalities of Wallachia and Moldavia brought urbanisation, craftsmanship, trade, and the so-called German law, under which the local administrations of medieval Romanian towns had operated in the beginning. 

However, throughout the passing of time, demographically, their numbers gradually dwindled and had been subsequently assimilated in the local medieval Wallachian and Moldavian cultures by the overwhelming Romanian ethnic majority.

Status of privileged class in Transylvania 

Along with the largely Hungarian-Transylvanian nobility and the Székelys, the Transylvanian Saxons were members of the Unio Trium Nationum (or 'Union of the Three Nations'), which was a charter signed in 1438. This agreement preserved a considerable degree of political rights for the three aforementioned groups but excluded the largely Hungarian and Romanian peasantry from political life in the principality.

During the Protestant Reformation, most Transylvanian Saxons converted to Lutheranism. As the semi-independent Principality of Transylvania was one of the most religiously tolerant states in Europe at the time, the Saxons were allowed to practice their own religion (meaning that they enjoyed religious autonomy). However, the Habsburgs still promoted Roman Catholicism to the Saxons during the Counter-Reformation. Currently in Romania, about 60% of ethnic Germans reported being Roman Catholic and 40% Protestant (see Religion in Romania).

Warfare between the Habsburg monarchy and Hungary against the Ottoman Empire from the 16th–18th centuries decreased the population of Transylvanian Saxons. All throughout this period of time, the Saxons in Transylvania served as administrators and military officers. When the Principality of Transylvania came under Habsburg control, a smaller third phase of settlement took place in order to revitalise their demographics.

This wave of settlement included exiled Protestants from Upper Austria (the Transylvanian Landlers namely), who were given land near Hermannstadt (Sibiu). The predominantly German-populated Hermannstadt was a noteworthy cultural center within Transylvania in the past, while Kronstadt (Brașov) represented a vital political center for the Transylvanian Saxons. Brașov/Kronstadt was more populous compared to Sibiu/Hermannstadt but historically the latter remained the most important town in Transylvania for the Transylvanian Saxons (as a well as a very important town for the Transylvanian Romanians).

Loss of elite status and unification with the Kingdom of Romania 

Emperor Joseph II attempted to revoke the Unio Trium Nationum in the late 18th century. His actions were aimed at the political inequality within Transylvania, especially the political strength of the Saxons.

Although his actions were ultimately rescinded, many Saxons began to see themselves as being a small minority opposed by nationalist Romanians and Hungarians. Although they remained a rich and influential group, the Saxons were no longer a dominant class within Modern Age Transylvania.

The Hungarians, on the other hand, supported complete unification of Transylvania with the rest of Hungary. Stephan Ludwig Roth, an Evangelical Lutheran pastor and intellectual who led the German support for Romanian political rights, eventually opposed the unification of Transylvania with Hungary and was executed by the Hungarian military tribunal during the revolution.

Although the Hungarian control over Transylvania was defeated by Austrian and Imperial Russian forces in 1849, the Austro-Hungarian Compromise of 1867 between Austria and Hungary in 1867 did not represent a positive transformation for the political rights of the Saxons. After the end of World War I, on 8 January 1919, the representatives of the Transylvanian Saxons decided to support the unification of Transylvania with the Kingdom of Romania.

They were promised full minority rights, but many wealthy Saxons lost part of their land in the land reform process that was implemented in the whole of Romania after World War I. Subsequently, taking into account the rise of Adolf Hitler in Germany, many Transylvanian Saxons became staunch supporters of national socialism, with the Evangelical Lutheran Church losing, eventually, very much of its influence in the community as time passed by.

World War II and afterwards 

In February 1942 and May 1943, Germany concluded agreements with Hungary and Romania respectively, following which the Germans who were fit for military service, although they were either Hungarian citizens (in northern Transylvania, entered the composition of the Hungarian state through the Second Vienna Award) or Romanian citizens (in southern Transylvania, remaining part of Romania), could be incorporated into the regular German military units, into the Waffen-SS and into war-producing enterprises or into the Organisation Todt.

As a result of these agreements, approximately 95% of the members of the German ethnic group who were fit for military service (Transylvanian Saxons and Banat Swabians) voluntarily enrolled into the Waffen-SS units (approximately 63,000 people), with several thousand serving in the special units of the SS Security Service (SD-Sonderkommandos), of which at least 2,000 ethnic Germans were enrolled in the concentration camps (KZ-Wachkompanien), of which at least 55% served in extermination camps, predominantly in Auschwitz and Lublin. About 15% of the Romanian ethnic Germans who served in the Waffen-SS died in the war, with only a few thousand survivors returning to Romania.

When Romania signed a peace treaty with the Soviets in 1944, the German military began withdrawing the Saxons from Transylvania; this operation was most thorough with the Saxons of the Nösnerland (Bistrița area). Around 100,000 Germans fled before the Soviet Red Army, but Romania did not conduct the expulsion of Germans as did neighboring countries at war's end. However, more than 70,000 Germans from Romania were arrested by the Soviet Army and sent to labour camps in contemporary Ukraine for alleged cooperation with Nazi Germany.

In 1989, still 95,000 Saxons lived in Romania (approx. 40% of the population of 1910), and between 1991 and 1992 another 75,000 emigrated. Their number shrank to 14,770 according to the data provided by the Evangelical Church of the Augsburg Confession in Romania in 2003.

Because they are considered Auslandsdeutsche ("Germans from abroad") by the German government, the Saxons have the right to German citizenship under the law of return. Numerous Saxons have emigrated to Germany, especially after the fall of the Eastern Bloc in 1989 and are represented by the Association of Transylvanian Saxons in Germany. Due to this emigration from Romania the population of Saxons is dwindling. At the same time, especially after Romania's accession into NATO and the EU, many Transylvanian Saxons are returning from Germany, reclaiming property lost to the former communist regime and/or starting up small and medium-sized enterprises. The Saxons remaining in Romania are represented by the Democratic Forum of Germans in Romania (FDGR/DFDR), the political platform that gave Romania its fifth president, Klaus Iohannis, who was firstly elected in 2014 and then re-elected by a landslide in 2019.

Culture 

Before their expulsion from communist Romania by communist and securist Romanian authorities, the Transylvanian Saxons formed distinct communities in their towns and villages, where they maintained their ethnic tradition characterised by specific customs, folklore, way of life, and distinctive clothing style (i.e. national costumes or Sächsische Trachten). For example, one of the traditions held was the "Neighborhood" in which many households formed a small supporting community. This, according to some scholars, is of ancient German origin.

Cuisine 

The cuisine of the Transylvanian Saxons is very similar to that of the Romanians and the Hungarians living in Transylvania as well as to the Germans, Austrians, or Alemannic Swiss. In these regards, the Transylvanian Saxon cuisine can be regarded as quintessentially Central European. It also shares some identical dishes with the Austrian cuisine such as cremeschnitte (which has also been traditionally served in Bukovina as well).

One prominent example of a local traditional dessert of the Transylvanian Saxons is the hanklich, a sweet cheese pie with powdered sugar on top (variations include plums as main ingredients, raisins, or other dry fruits). This particular pastry is still served in restaurants and bakeries in southern Transylvania, particularly in Brașov and Sibiu counties, where, historically, there had been a more significant Transylvanian Saxon ethnic presence compared to the other counties across Transylvania. In Romanian, it is also known as lichiu săsesc or just lichiu. Another example of a traditional Transylvanian Saxon dish is kipferl which can be filled with vanilla, many types of fruit jams, but also with meat. Another traditional Transylvanian Saxon dish is palukes. Kartoffelknodel is yet another noteworthy traditional Transylvanian Saxon delight.

Other traditional Transylvanian Saxon dishes include:

 Apple soup;
 Brodelawend (beef soup);
 Strudel;
 Apple pie;
 Lebkuchen (i.e. gingerbread);
 Pancakes (Palatschinke style) with cheese (more specifically curd).

Dialect 

The Transylvanian Saxon dialect (endonym: Siweberjesch-Såksesch or simply just Såksesch) is a very conservative and rather archaic German dialect that has evolved throughout the passing of time relatively isolated from other German dialects (apart, most notably, from Transylvanian Landler). It has also come in contact with Romanian and Hungarian from which several words were derived. Nevertheless, Transylvanian Saxon is very similar to Luxembourgish and sounds as a form of medieval German (e.g. Old High German or Middle High German). 

The similarities with Luxembourgish are both in lexical nature and grammar nature. It also has a series of characters which are different than in standard German (i.e. Hochdeutsch), for example 'å' (or dumpfes a as it is known in standard German) which is pronounced as in Norwegian or Danish. It is also important to note the fact that even proper names of some Transylvanian Saxon localities sound very similar to Luxembourgish (e.g. 'Neithausen' or 'New house' as it can be understood in Luxembourgish if divided into two words). The earliest text in Transylvanian Saxon was written by Johannes Tröster in 1666.

In comparative linguistics, Transylvanian Saxon is a West Central German dialect that is part of the Moselle Franconian branch. Historically, it has been spoken more in rural areas of Transylvania and to a lesser extent in the urban settlements where Transylvanian Saxons lived. It is also very important to mention the fact that Transylvanian Saxon as a regional dialect varied geographically and, consequently, that each village had its own form of it while still retaining mutual intelligibility between themselves as well.

Literature 

The Transylvanian Saxon literature represents a part of the German literature in Central and Eastern Europe as well as a part of Romanian literature. It has been written by Transylvanian Saxon writers since the Middle Ages onwards, in Latin, the Transylvanian Saxon dialect, and Standard German. Writers of partial German/Transylvanian Saxon descent from Transylvania such as Nicolae Breban have also been writing in Romanian. The Transylvanian Saxon literature consists of both prose and poems, ranging from folk tales, folk ballads, and ecclesiastical texts such as prayers. Notable Transylvanian Saxon writers include Josef/Joseph Haltrich and Dutz Schuster (also known as Gustav Schuster-Dutz; full name at birth: Gustav Michael Julius Schuster).

Anthem 

Das Siebenbürgenlied (i.e. The song of Transylvania) is the regional anthem of the Transylvanian Saxon community as well as an unofficial regional hymn of Transylvania, praising the region as a land of blessings and great natural beauty. It was written and composed in the mid 19th century. The lyricist was Maximilian Leopold Moltke and the composer was Transylvanian Saxon Johann Lukas Hedwig from Hălchiu. The anthem is also known as Siebenbürgen, Land des Segens (literally Transylvania, land of blessings).

Famous Transylvanian Saxons 

Famous Transylvanian Saxons include intellectuals Johannes Honterus, Christian Schesaeus, Johannes Sommer, Samuel von Brukenthal, Georg Maurer, Johann Böhm, or Stephan Ludwig Roth, composers such as Georg Meyndt and Carl Filtsch, visual artists such as Fritz Schullerus, Edith Soterius von Sachsenheim, or Friedrich Miess, scientists such as Hermann Oberth and Conrad Haas, or sportsmen such as Michael Klein, Mora Windt-Martini, or Otto Tellmann. Well known Transylvanian Saxon politicians and administrative leaders include Michael Weiß (former mayor of Brașov/Kronstadt), Klaus Johannis (current President of Romania and former mayor of Sibiu/Hermannstadt), Iancu Sasul (i.e. John the Saxon), Johannes Benkner (a former mayor of Brașov/Kronstadt), or Astrid Fodor (current mayor of Sibu/Hermannstadt).

Further reading 

 Așezarea sașilor în Transilvania (i.e. The settlement of the Transylvanian Saxons in Transylvania) by archaeologist and professor doctor Thomas Nägler
 Povești din folclorul germanilor din România by Roland Schenn, Corint publishing house, 2014 (in Romanian)
 Meschendorf by Jessica Klein (in English and German)
 Palukes für die Seele: Gedichte aus Siebenbürgen by Yasmin Mai-Schoger (poetry book in German)
 The Rise and Fall of Saxon Transylvania by Cătălin Gruia (in English)
 The literary works of Josef Haltrich, Transylvanian Saxon writer and collector of folktales
 The literary works of Dutz Schuster, Transylvanian Saxon writer and poet

See also 

 Association of Transylvanian Saxons in Germany
 Germans
 Germans of Romania
 Villages with fortified churches in Transylvania
 List of fortified churches in Transylvania
 List of Transylvanian Saxon localities
 German exonyms in Transylvania
 Transylvanian rugs
 Saxons in medieval Serbia
 Transylvanian Saxon dialect
 Siebenbürgenlied
 Transylvanian Museum in Gundelsheim, Baden-Württemberg, Germany
 Seat (administrative division)
 The Pied Piper of Hamelin is said to have been inspired by a migration of Germans to Transylvania.
 Flight and expulsion of Germans (1944–1950)

Notes

References

External links 

 Unsere Deutsche Wurzeln/Our German Roots - Namensemantik (Deutung) der Siebenbürgisch-Sächsische Familliennamen (Surnames) 
 Map and list of Transylvanian Saxon villages
 An Outline of Transsilvanian-Saxon History by Klaus Popa, MA 
 The History of Transylvania and the Transylvania Saxons by Dr. Konrad Gündisch
 Transylvanian Saxon surnames
 Transylvanian placenames in different languages 
 General site on the Transylvanian Saxons 
 General forum for the Transylvanian Saxons 
 Alliance of Transylvanian Saxons
 'Hover & Hear' pronunciations in the Transylvanian Saxon language as spoken in Honigberg (Hărman), and compare with equivalents in English and other Germanic languages.
 Article in the academic journal Nationalities Papers on Transylvanian Saxon identity between 1933 and 1944
 Visual short story about the Transylvanian Saxons (with many archive images)

12th-century establishments in Europe
German diaspora in Europe
Transylvanian Saxon people
Saxons
History of Transylvania
Transylvania in the Kingdom of Hungary